Gustavo Larrea is a former Interior Minister of Ecuador who had been appointed in 2006. A commission set up by President Rafael Correa to investigate Operacion Fenix alleged that Larrea had direct links to FARC, which Larrea disputed. By 2011 Larrea had become a notable critic of President Correa, particularly in regard to an effort to "revamp" the judicial system. Larrea called this idea "an authoritarian project" and an attempt to "control the courts".

References 

Government ministers of Ecuador
Ecuadorian socialists
Year of birth missing (living people)
Living people